Paul Chambers Quintet is the fourth studio album by American jazz bassist Paul Chambers recorded in 1957 and released on the Blue Note label in April 1958. The quintet features trumpeter Donald Byrd, tenor saxophonist Clifford Jordan, pianist Tommy Flanagan and drummer Elvin Jones.

Reception
The Allmusic review by Steve Leggett awarded the album 4 stars stating: "Nothing is particularly innovative with this set, but these tracks don't push or pull against themselves, either, and there's a clear joy coming off of the floor as these musicians, all in the early phases of their careers, do what they do with comforting assurance".

Track listing
All compositions by Paul Chambers except where noted
 "Minor Run-Down" (Benny Golson) – 7:36
 "The Hand of Love" – 6:22
 "Softly, as in a Morning Sunrise" (Oscar Hammerstein II, Sigmund Romberg) – 3:06
 "Four Strings" (Golson) – 5:26
 "What's New?" (Johnny Burke, Bob Haggart) – 5:38
 "Beauteous" – 8:05
 "Four Strings" [alternate take] (Golson) – 5:11 Bonus track on CD reissue

Personnel
Paul Chambers – bass
Donald Byrd – trumpet (tracks 1–2 & 4–7)
Clifford Jordan – tenor saxophone (tracks 1–2 & 4–7)
Tommy Flanagan – piano
Elvin Jones – drums

References

Blue Note Records albums
Paul Chambers albums
1958 albums
Albums produced by Alfred Lion
Albums recorded at Van Gelder Studio